Himekawa Station is the name of two train stations in Japan:

 Himekawa Station (Hokkaido), a railway station in Mori
 Himekawa Station (Niigata), a railway station in Itoigawa